Love Thy Neighbor or Love Thy Neighbour refers to the Biblical phrase "thou shalt love thy neighbor as thyself" from the Book of Leviticus 19:18 in the Old Testament about the ethic of reciprocity known as the Golden Rule or the Great Commandment.

Love Thy Neighbor or Love Thy Neighbour may also refer to:

Film 
 Love Thy Neighbor (1940 film), an American film
 Love Thy Neighbour (1967 film), a Danish-German comedy film
 Love Thy Neighbour (1973 film), a British film based on the situation comedy series
 Love Thy Neighbor (1984 film), an American television-film
 Love Thy Neighbor (2003 film), a direct-to-video animated film directed by Tony Bancroft
 Love Thy Neighbor (2005 film), with Scott Wolf
 Love Thy Neighbor (2006 film), a Canadian television-film

Television 
 Love Thy Neighbour (1972 TV series), a 1972–1976 British situation comedy television series
 Love Thy Neighbor, a 1973 American comedy television series starring Joyce Bulifant and Ron Masak
 Love Thy Neighbour (2011 British TV series), a reality television series that aired on Channel 4
 Love Thy Neighbour (Singaporean TV series), a 2011 MediaCorp Channel 8 Singaporean Mandarin drama
 Love Thy Neighbor (American TV series), a 2013–2017 comedy television series that aired on OWN

Audiobook 
 Love Thy Neighbor, a 2019 audiobook by voice actress, writer, producer Hillary Hawkins

Other 
 Love Thy Neighbor (book), the book by Peter Maass
 Love Thy Neighbor: The Tory Diary of Prudence Emerson, a novel in the Dear America series
"Love Thy Neighbor", a song from the musical The Prom
"Love Thy Neighbor", a song from the 1934 film We're Not Dressing